A toll house is a building or facility where a toll is collected on a toll road, canal, or bridge.

Toll house may also refer to:

Individual toll houses
 The Round House, Stanton Drew, also known as The Toll House 
 La Vale Tollgate House
 Petersburg Tollhouse
 Searights Tollhouse, National Road
 Toll House (Burke, Vermont), toll house for the Burke Mountain Road

Geography
 Tollhouse, California, town, built around Tollhouse Road, in the western Sierra Nevada of California
 Tollhouse Road, part of which shares California State Route 168 as a 2-lane road from the end of the 4-lane freeway

Other uses
 Aerial toll house, a controversial belief in Eastern Orthodoxy
 Toll House cookies, brand of chocolate-chip cookie
 Toll House Inn, restaurant that originated the cookie